Arthur Cox (7 December 1904 – 20 September 1977) was a New Zealand cricketer. He played in five first-class matches for Canterbury from 1924 to 1927.

In Cox's second first-class match, which began on Christmas Day 1925, he opened the batting and scored 204 in 280 minutes against Otago. It was only the second double-century in the Plunket Shield. Canterbury went on to make 495 and win by an innings and 28 runs.

See also
 List of Canterbury representative cricketers

References

External links
 

1904 births
1977 deaths
New Zealand cricketers
Canterbury cricketers
Cricketers from Christchurch